Sphingobacterium canadense is a Gram-negative bacterium from the genus of Sphingobacterium which has been isolated from corn roots.

References

External links
Sphingobacterium_canadense at MicrobeWiki

Sphingobacteriia
Bacteria described in 2008